Communist Party in Denmark is a Communist party in Denmark.

KPiD was founded in 1990, as a split from the Communist Party of Denmark (DKP). The founders of KPiD opposed the DKP decision (with other political fractions) to start the Red–Green Alliance political party. KPiD can be seen as more ideologically orthodox than DKP.

KPiD is one of four active communist parties in Denmark. In recent years, attempts of the DKP, the KPiD and the KP to form a unified communist party have failed. The fourth communist party, the Workers' Communist Party (APK) refused to participate in the talks.

See also 
 Communist Party (KP)
 Communist Party of Denmark (DKP)
 Workers' Communist Party (APK)

References 

1990 establishments in Denmark
Communist parties in Denmark
Political parties established in 1990
International Meeting of Communist and Workers Parties